The Liberty Cap Glacier is a small glacier located near the summit of Mount Rainier, Washington. True to its name, the glacier does start at the  Liberty Cap above the steep and rocky Sunset Amphitheater and the Mowich Face.

See also
List of glaciers

References

Glaciers of Mount Rainier
Glaciers of Washington (state)